The Division of Bean is an electoral division for the Australian House of Representatives in the Australian Capital Territory (ACT) and Norfolk Island, which was created in 2018 and contested for the first time at the 2019 federal election.

Geography
Federal electoral division boundaries in Australia are determined at redistributions by a redistribution committee appointed by the Australian Electoral Commission. Redistributions occur for the boundaries of divisions in a particular state, and they occur every seven years, or sooner if a state's representation entitlement changes or when divisions of a state are malapportioned.

History

The division is named in honour of Charles Bean, an Australian war correspondent and historian during World War I.

The Division of Bean was created in 2018 by the Australian Electoral Commission, as part of a reapportionment to establish a third seat in the Australian Capital Territory which occurred due to population growth in the territory. The division is located in the south of the ACT and takes in the urban districts of Tuggeranong, the Molonglo Valley, Weston Creek and southern Woden Valley, the rural districts of Booth, Coree, Paddys River, Stromlo and Tennent and the uninhabited districts of Cotter River, Mount Clear and Rendezvous Creek. The external territory of Norfolk Island is also included in the division.

The division was notionally held by the Labor Party on a margin of 8.9%.

In October 2021 the Norfolk Island Party was formed by businessman Peter Christian-Bailey to contest the seat with the goal of self determination for Norfolk Island.

Members

Election results

References

External links
 Division of Bean – Australian Electoral Commission

Electoral divisions of Australia
Constituencies established in 2019
2019 establishments in Australia